Shelter is an album by The Brand New Heavies, released in 1997 on the Delicious Vinyl record label. It is the only album by the Brand New Heavies to feature singer-songwriter Siedah Garrett as a member of the band, joining them in 1996 and leaving in early 1998 to concentrate on her own songwriting.

Single releases
With Garrett as part of the Brand New Heavies they enjoyed their only UK top 10 hit with a cover of the Carole King-penned song "You've Got a Friend", originally made famous by James Taylor. It reached number 9 when released as the third single from the album. Their cover did not appear on initial pressings of the US version of Shelter but was added to later pressings after the band's record label Delicious Vinyl secured distribution from Bertelsmann Music Group.

The album also contains the hit "Sometimes", which peaked at number 11 on the UK Singles Chart when released in 1997. One of the remixes of "Sometimes" featured the rap vocals of Q-Tip from A Tribe Called Quest. In 2015, production team Jimmy Jam and Terry Lewis revealed that the remix done by J Dilla which featured Q-Tip was the inspiration behind the sound of Janet Jackson's 1997 single "Got 'til It's Gone".

"You Are the Universe" and "Shelter" were the other singles from the album, reaching numbers 21 and 31 respectively in the UK Singles Chart.

Track listing

Personnel
The Brand New Heavies
Simon Bartholomew
Siedah Garrett – vocals
Jan Kincaid
Andrew Levy

Charts

Certifications

References

The Brand New Heavies albums
1997 albums
Delicious Vinyl albums